Pterymarchia is a genus of large predatory sea snails, marine gastropod mollusks in the family Muricidae, the rock snails or murex snails.

Species
Species within the genus Pterymarchia include: 
 Pterymarchia aparri  (D'Attilio & Bertsch, 1980)
 Pterymarchia barclayana  (H. Adams, 1873)
 Pterymarchia bibbeyi  (Radwin & D'Attilio, 1976)
 Pterymarchia bipinnata  (Reeve, 1845)
 Pterymarchia bouteti  (Houart, 1990)
 Pterymarchia elatica  Houart, 2000
 Pterymarchia martinetana  (Roding, 1798)
 Pterymarchia triptera  (Born, 1778)

References

 WoRMS info

External links
 

Muricidae